Ahmed Zein El-Abidin (born 17 June 1943) is an Egyptian former épée and foil fencer. He competed at the 1960 and 1968 Summer Olympics. At the 1960 Games, he represented the United Arab Republic.

References

External links
 

1943 births
Living people
Egyptian male épée fencers
Olympic fencers of Egypt
Fencers at the 1960 Summer Olympics
Fencers at the 1968 Summer Olympics
Sportspeople from Cairo
Egyptian male foil fencers
20th-century Egyptian people